Kunzeana kunzei is a species of leafhopper in the family Cicadellidae.

References

Articles created by Qbugbot
Insects described in 1898
Dikraneurini